The 2400-series is a series of Chicago "L" cars built between 1976 and 1978 by Boeing-Vertol of Ridley Park, Pennsylvania, with shells fabricated by Sorefame. 200 cars were built (numbered 2401–2600) and on October 31, 2014, the series was retired from revenue service. These cars were in service for 38 years.

The 2400-series is the third of five series of Chicago "L" cars known as the High Performance Family. These cars were the first "L" cars built since the 4000 series of 1914 to feature sliding doors rather than the folding blinker doors featured on the other cars that were in service at the time, with wider doorways allowing the cars to accommodate wheelchair users. The 2400-series cars featured smooth steel exteriors as opposed to the corrugated exteriors of the previous series, as well as all-fiberglass end bonnets as opposed to the stainless steel end bonnets with fiberglass window/headlight masks found on the previous series cars. As delivered, the cars featured a red, white and blue color scheme on the front and rear of the cars, as well as stripes along the sides. Cars 2401–2422 were later modified to be used for work service as well as revenue passenger service and given red and white striping along their sides as well as on the front and rear of the cars. The cars were rehabbed at the Skokie Shops in Skokie, Illinois from 1987 until 1995. These work motor units remain active.

Beginning in Fall 2003, the red, white and blue colors on the ends and sides of the 2400-series cars were removed, giving the cars an unpainted steel appearance similar to the rest of the "L" fleet. This was done so as to give a more unified appearance, as well as to reduce maintenance costs. The work cars retain the red and white striping on their ends, but the stripes on their sides have been removed.

In the 1990s, the 2400-series cars were used on the Red Line in mixed consists with unrehabbed 2600-series cars. While the 2600-series cars were being rebuilt, the 2400-series cars were used temporarily on the Red Line. These cars were used again on the Red Line from 2012 to 2013. From the reopening of the Green Line on May 12, 1996 until mid-May 2013, these cars were assigned to the Green Line and they were replaced by the 5000-series cars. Until late May 2014, these cars were also assigned to the Purple Line; for the entire 2000s and early 2010s, the Purple Line fleet consisted entirely, or nearly entirely of these cars. The Purple Line fleet of 2400-series cars were retired in May 2014 and have been replaced by the 2600-series cars which were transferred from the Red Line as more 5000-series cars were assigned to that line and since April 2014, several 5000-series cars have been assigned to the Purple Line as well. From November 8, 2012 until retirement on October 31, 2014, some of these cars were also assigned to the Orange Line. During the morning rush hour on October 31, 2014, the 2400-series operated its last revenue run on the Orange Line. The Orange Line cars have been replaced by the 2600-series cars until the Red and Purple Lines are fully equipped with the 5000-series cars. However, as of November 2015, the assignment of 2600-series cars to the Orange Line is now permanent until the delivery of the future 7000-series cars, since all 5000-series cars have been delivered with all cars fully assigned to all lines except for the Orange, Blue, and Brown Lines.

These cars were used for the Lake/Dan Ryan, West-Northwest, Ravenswood and Howard/Englewood routes.

Retirement of the 2400-series cars began in 2013, after the retirement of the 2200-series cars and was completed in October 2014, 194 of the 200 cars built remained in service into the 21st century.

After retirement, several cars were preserved. Preserved cars include:
 2433-2434, preserved at the Illinois Railway Museum in Union, Illinois. 
 2455-2456, 2489-2490, 2537-2538, 2543-2544, used for the ceremonial last trip of the 2400-series cars on January 21, 2015, and now for current CTA fantrips.
 2503, used for training at the Muscatatuck Urban Training Center.
 2541, converted to a lounge in an apartment building.

References

External links

Chicago "L" rolling stock
Electric multiple units of the United States
Train-related introductions in 1976
Railway services discontinued in 2014